Free Flying Soul is the ninth studio release, and eighth full-length album, from Christian alternative rock band the Choir, released in 1996. It earned the band its first industry recognition with a Dove Award win.

Background
After the release of Speckled Bird, lead singer and guitarist Derri Daugherty and drummer and lyricist Steve Hindalong regrouped to work on their second worship album, At the Foot of the Cross, Volume Two: Seven Last Words of Christ. Unlike Volume One, which was released on the band's Glasshouse Records label, then sold poorly and quickly went out of print, Volume Two would get a larger release on Myrrh Records, with greater label support, including a radio special. The album included more high-profile contemporary Christian and black gospel artists including Bryan Duncan, Babbie Mason, Charlie Peacock, Anointed, Brent Bourgeois (from Bourgeois Tagg) and Marty McCall (from First Call). Daugherty and Hindalong then followed up with the Christmas-themed Noel, another multi-artist effort which included Kevin Max (from DC Talk), Buddy and Julie Miller, Riki Michele (from Adam Again) and Michael Pritzl (from the Violet Burning).

After the Choir's one-off deal with R.E.X. Records for the release of Speckled Bird, Daugherty and Hindalong signed a new publishing deal with Benson Records.  Because Benson was looking to expand their roster of alternative rock artists, they hired saxophone and Lyricon player Dan Michaels — who had gained plenty of marketing and A&R experience running the Glasshouse label — to lead the new Tattoo Records imprint. To successfully launch the new label, it made sense that the first release should be from an established artist. As a result, the Choir went to work on their next album, which would turn out to be their last for a Christian record company.

Recording and production
Free Flying Soul was recorded in a scant six weeks. As Hindalong only had lyrics for "Polar Boy" and "The Chicken" going into the studio, he initially thought that it would result in a record with a much darker mood. However, Daugherty was in a very positive place after the recent birth of his daughter, so his contributions were "warm, whimsical chord progressions." Even though the band flew in bass guitarist Tim Chandler for three weeks, then followed up the balance of recording with Wayne Everett in an attempt to "rough up" and "ruin things a bit," the tone of the album turned out much more upbeat than their recent work, more in keeping with 1989's Wide-Eyed Wonder. Hindalong considers the final track, "The Warbler," to be “the finest guitar treatment Derri has given a song.”

Artwork and packaging
Upon initial release, the album cover artwork for Free Flying Soul differed for each of the two main audio formats at that time (CD and cassette). The cat clock featured in the interior artwork was Michaels' own, and the flying creature on the cover of the CD was brought on tour with the band, where it hung inside Hindalong's bass drum.

Release

Audio
The album was released in March of 1996 on CD and cassette. "The Ocean" was sent to Christian radio as the first single, where it entered the Christian CHR charts at #18.

Video
An hour of the Choir’s 1996 performance at Cornerstone on their tour for Free Flying Soul was included on the video release, Tattoo Video Hoopla, Volume 1, in 1998, which also featured a concept video for "Sled Dog."

Tour
When signing with Tattoo, the Choir agreed to a tour in support of Free Flying Soul as long as that tour would be its last. With the assistance of Wayne Everett on percussion and Bill Campbell (from the Throes) on guitar, the Choir played its "farewell tour" for four months in 1996, which concluded in July at the Sonshine Festival in Minnesota. The Choir's first live album, Let it Fly, chronicled this tour and was released in 1997.

Response

Critical reaction
Critical reaction at the time was positive. Mark Sherwood, writing for Cross Rhythms, said the "lyrics are as always, deep," and added that, "musically, they are not afraid to experiment and try things out of the ordinary." He called "If You're Listening," a "standout track […] with lyrics that soothe the soul."

Retrospectively, the album has been well-received. Darryl Cater at AllMusic called Free Flying Soul "a little less noisy" than Speckled Bird. While criticizing the songwriting for being "a bit short on fresh ideas this time," he pointed out that "there also moments of alluringly adventurous intelligence." He concluded that with this album, the band had struck a "rare balance of hope and humility." Barry Alfonso, in The Billboard Guide to Contemporary Christian Music, wrote that Free Flying Soul was "an extension of what Speckled Bird had achieved," and was "among the group's most popular" releases. Mark Allan Powell, writing in the Encyclopedia of Contemporary Christian Music, said that Free Flying Soul "celebrates the ability to find pleasure in little things, including a few things that aren't always on conservative Christianity's approved pleasures menu: a glass of wine at a wedding ('Away with the Swine') or a cigar with a neighbor who's just had a child ('Yellow-Haired Monkeys')." He singled out "The Ocean" as an album highlight, calling the "Beatlesque Sgt. Peppers-type tune" "practically a worship song, likening the Christian church to a sea that is continually purified by the tears of God."

Accolades
 CCM Magazine
 Readers' Choice: Best Alt/Rock Album (included in list)

Awards and nominations
 28th Annual Dove Awards (1997) – Modern Rock Album of the Year (winner)

Track listing
All lyrics by Steve Hindalong. All music by Derri Daugherty, unless otherwise noted.

Personnel
The Choir
 Derri Daugherty - lead vocals, guitars
 Steve Hindalong - drums, percussion, child's piano, vocals, lead vocal on "Slow Spin"
 Tim Chandler - bass guitar, guitars
 Dan Michaels - Lyricon

Additional musicians
 Wayne Everett - guitar, percussion, bongos, hand claps, chimes, sleigh bells, vocals
 Phil Madeira - Chamberlin strings and flutes
 Chrissy Colbert - bass guitar effects
 Marc Byrd - vocals
 Jenny Gullen - vocals
 Jerry Chamberlain - vocals
 Sharon McCall - vocals

Production
 Steve Hindalong – producer
 Derri Daugherty – producer, engineer, mixer ("The Ocean," "Slow Spin" at Neverland Studios)
 Skye McCaskey – engineer
 Paul Salvo – mixer (Scrimshaw Sound)
 Tim Chandler – inspiration, additional production
 Wayne Everett – inspiration, additional production
 Norman Jean Roy - cover and creature photos
 Jim Dantzler – art direction, design (Flywheel Design)
 Dan Michaels – art coordination, clock photo
 Gina Gigglio – styling, creature hunt

References
Footnotes

Bibliography

External links
 

1996 albums
The Choir (alternative rock band) albums